Portugal competed at the 1998 Winter Olympics in Nagano, Japan.

A delegation of two competitors participated in two sports but no medal was gained.

Freestyle skiing

Women

Speed skating

Men

Officials
 João Oliveira (chief of mission)

References

 

Nations at the 1998 Winter Olympics
1998 Winter Olympics
Winter Olympics